The Butte Roughriders were a Tier III Junior A ice hockey team located in Butte, Montana. The team joined the Northern Pacific Hockey League's America West Division in 2003 when the league competed at the Tier III Jr. B level. In 2007 The NorPac was granted Tier III Junior A status by USA Hockey.

In November 2011, it was announced that the Roughriders had withdrawn from NorPac because they were unable to field the minimum number of players required due to injuries and players leaving the team.

The Roughriders played their home games at the Butte Civic Center.

Alumni
The team had a few alumni move on to collegiate hockey and higher levels of junior ice hockey, but only had one player of note: Kyle Valentine, a defenseman, who played two seasons at Oakland University (ACHA) in Michigan.

References

External links 
Official site

Ice hockey teams in Montana
2003 establishments in Montana
2011 disestablishments in Montana
Ice hockey clubs established in 2003
Ice hockey clubs disestablished in 2011
Butte, Montana